Smith Valley is a census-designated place (CDP) in Lyon County, Nevada, United States. The population was 1,603 at the 2010 census.

Geography
Smith Valley is located in southwestern Lyon County at  (38.819204, -119.355912), occupying the valley of the same name. The valley is bordered to the west by the Pine Nut Mountains, to the north by the Buckskin Range, to the east by the Singatse Range, to the southwest by the Wellington Hills, and to the southeast by the Pine Grove Hills. The CDP occupies the western and central parts of the valley, with the western border of the CDP following the Douglas County line.

Nevada State Route 208 passes through the valley, leading northeast  to Yerington, the Lyon county seat, and west  to U.S. Route 395 north of Topaz Lake. State Route 338 leads south from Smith Valley  to the California border, where State Route 182 leads an additional  to Bridgeport, California.

The central part of the valley is drained by the West Walker River, which exits the valley to the east through Wilson Canyon. The northern part of the valley is an endorheic basin, with Artesia Lake occupying the lowest area.

Demographics

As of the census of 2000, there were 1,422 people, 553 households, and 419 families residing in the CDP. The population density was 11.8 people per square mile (4.6/km). There were 610 housing units at an average density of 5.1 per square mile (2.05/km). The racial makeup of the CDP was 89.23% White, 0.27% African American, 1.20% Native American, 0.28% Asian, 0.07% Pacific Islander, 8.01% from other races, and 1.96% from two or more races. Hispanic or Latino of any race were 19.37% of the population.

There were 553 households, out of which 35.5% had children under the age of 17 living with them, 69.2% were married couples living together, 3.3% had a female householder with no husband present, and 24.1% were non-families. 19.0% of all households were made up of individuals, and 6.9% had someone living alone who was 65 years of age or older. The average household size was 2.56 and the average family size was 2.92.

In the CDP, the population was spread out, with 24.1% under the age of 18, 4.6% from 18 to 24, 24.2% from 25 to 44, 31.6% from 45 to 64, and 15.6% who were 65 years of age or older. The median age was 43 years. For every 100 females, there were 103.6 males. For every 100 females age 18 and over, there were 104.2 males.

The median income for a household in the CDP was $46,803, and the median income for a family was $46,625. Males had a median income of $31,574 versus $29,038 for females. The per capita income for the CDP was $21,940. About 8.4% of families and 12.3% of the population were below the poverty line, including 13.2% of those under age 18 and none of those age 65 or over.

Wovoka, also known as Jack Wilson, a Northern Paiute religious leader who founded the Ghost Dance movement of 1890, was born and raised in Smith Valley.

Water use and shortages 
The West Walker River flows through Smith Valley, and for more than a century the flows of the Walker have been diverted to irrigate farms and ranches. Diversions of the Walker River have contributed to near complete ecosystem collapse of Walker Lake. The primary crops grown in Smith Valley are alfalfa and hay.

In addition to the use of surface water that has led to the ecological collapse of Walker Lake, Smith Valley water users have withdrawn groundwater at an unsustainable rate for at least 50 years. In 2015, the Nevada Department of Water Resources issues Order 1267, limiting the use of supplemental groundwater in Smith and Mason Valleys. The order was subsequently struck down by state district court, as the order's 50% curtailment of all supplemental groundwater rights was found to abridge the priority dates of some supplemental groundwater right owners. During the same time period, the Walker River through Smith Valley has significantly declined in stream efficiency, suggesting that groundwater pumping is leading to more river water leaving the channel to the groundwater table each year.

Smith Valley High School notable alumni
Robin L. Titus, Republican member of the Nevada Assembly

See also
Upper Colony Fire

References

Census-designated places in Lyon County, Nevada
Census-designated places in Nevada